Coupon may refer to the following:

 Coupon, a document exchanged in a retail context to provide a discount on goods or services
 Coupon (finance), with respect to bonds or certain derivatives, a coupon rate is the interest rate that the issuer pays to the bond holders
 Coupon (PWB), a printed circuit card used to test the quality of a printed wiring board (PWB) fabrication process.
 Coupon, Pennsylvania (place), a small, unincorporated community in Pennsylvania
 Football pools promoters in the United Kingdom use this name when referring to the paper grids which gamblers fill in to bet on the results of football fixtures
 Ukrainian karbovanets, the former Ukrainian currency
Coupon busters, these women's multi-style shoes fashionable in post-World War II England featured as a plot point in Foyle's War Series Seven, episode 2 ("The Cage")